Jamshed Thomas is a Pakistani politician who had been a member of the National Assembly of Pakistan from August 2018 till January 2023.

Political career

He was elected to the National Assembly of Pakistan as a candidate of Pakistan Tehreek-e-Insaf on a reserved seat for minorities in the 2018 Pakistani general election.

Resignation

In April 2022, he also resigned from the National Assembly seat along with all Tehreek-e-Insaaf members after the ouster of Imran Khan.

External Link

More Reading
 List of members of the 15th National Assembly of Pakistan
 List of Pakistan Tehreek-e-Insaf elected members (2013–2018)
 No-confidence motion against Imran Khan

References

Living people
Pakistani MNAs 2018–2023
Pakistan Tehreek-e-Insaf MNAs
Year of birth missing (living people)
Pakistani Christians